TheFilmSchool is a non-profit film program located in Seattle, Washington, that focuses on intensive training in screenwriting and directing. TheFilmSchool's mission statement 'to elevate the art of cinematic storytelling'  guides the curriculum to heavily emphasize character, structure, and understanding the principles of storytelling. The program was founded in 2003 by Stewart Stern, John Jacobsen, Rick Stevenson, Warren Etheredge, and Tom Skerritt.

Contests
TheFilmSchool launched the Great American Short Screenplay Contest in 2008, in partnership with the Seattle International Film Festival.
Christopher McQuarrie, Academy Award-winning screenwriter of The Usual Suspects, called TheFilmSchool "probably the best place in the world to study story."

Staff
Actor Robert Redford joined TheFilmSchool Advisory Board in 2008. All the founders still teach in the 3 Week Intensive. Various other producers, writers, and directors teach at the establishment. These include: John Jacobsen, Rick Stevenson, Warren Etheredge, Brian McDonald, Stacy Adams, and Stewart Stern, screenwriter of Rebel Without A Cause.

Notable alumni

Award winning alumni
Bert and Bertie, the writing and directing duo, are BAFTA Award winners.

Kristi L. Simkins won Best Narrative Short at the Rainier Independent Film Festival and a special Jury Selection award at the Lady Filmmakers Film Festival.

LaDora Mishan Sella and L. Gabriel Gonda won awards at HollyShorts and the Tacoma Film Festival, among others, for their film Brightwood.

Winda Benedetti won Washington State Screenwriting competition in 2006 and was a finalist in 2007.

Andrea Seybold and Kate Wharton's Drill Queen was selected as a semifinalist in Script Pipeline's 2008 TV Writing Competition.

Jessika Satori won multiple awards at the Action On Film International Film Festival for her film So You Shall Reap in 2012.

Andres Iseminger's Little Pricks was accepted as a finalist at the Beverly Hills Film Festival.

Alumni festival showings
Steven Schardt produced two films that were shown at the Sundance Film Festival, Humpday in 2009, and Your Sister's Sister in 2012, which starred Golden Globe winner Emily Blunt.  His own film, Treatment, which he wrote and directed was selected to play at the Tribeca Film Festival and the Seattle International Film Festival.

Kristi L. Simkins had her short, Something Special, admitted to the Cannes Film Festival, the Seattle International Film Festival.

Caleb Slain's documentary short It Ain’t Over played in the 2012 South by Southwest Film Festival.

Bert and Bertie's short film The Taxidermist played at the 2012 Seattle International Film Festival.

L. Gabriel Gonda directed two short films that premiered at the Seattle International Film Festival.  Love and War played at SIFF in 2011 and went on to play several other film festivals.  Brightwood played at SIFF in 2012 and the Tacoma Film Festival.

Sam Graydon worked on two short films that screened in the Seattle International Film Festival in 2012.  He was the director of photography on Bunker and wrote and directed Pretty Face.  Gary Busey starred in his 2011 short film Jenny, which he wrote and directed.

Winda Benedetti's short films have been in many festivals, including as 1 Reel Film Festival at Bumbershoot and the California Independent Film Festival.

Sue Corcoran's film Ira Finkelstein's Christmas (later released as Switchmas), which she co-wrote and directed, was accepted into the Seattle International Film Festival in 2012.  Its cast included Elliott Gould, David DeLuise, Elijah Nelson, and Cynthia Geary.  In 2005 her short film Circus of Infinity screened at the Science Fiction Fantasy Short Film Festival, the San Francisco International Film Festival, and the Seattle International Film Festival. Sue also worked as associate producer on Humpday and has written, directed and produced multiple other films.

Additional alumni works
Bert and Bertie's  first feature length film, Lucidity, is set to shoot in 2013.

Eric Morgret founded the Maelstrom International Fantastic Film Festival, and where he now serves as a Programming Director.

References

External links

Education in Seattle
Film schools in the United States
Non-profit organizations based in Seattle
Screenwriting organizations